Linga is one of the Shetland Islands, near Vementry. It is one of many islands in Shetland called Linga. The island is uninhabited.

Geography and geology
Linga's rock is schist and gneiss.

The islands of Gruna and the Heag (another common Shetland name) are to the North.

Brindister on the mainland is nearby.

References

Uninhabited islands of Shetland